Copeland is a small settlement in the Mid-Coast Council, New South Wales, Australia.

Women's rights activist, Mildred Muscio, was born at Copeland in 1882.

See also:
 Copeland Tops State Conservation Area

References

Suburbs of Mid-Coast Council